Catherine Brown (born 10 January 1994) is an Australian rules footballer playing for the Hawthorn Football Club in the AFL Women's (AFLW) competition. Brown is also a former soccer player, who last played for Canberra United in the Australian W-League.

Soccer career

Brown played 32 times for Canberra United in the W-League between 2012 and 2015. Her career at W-League ended after she sustained a long-term knee injury while training to play Australian rules football. She attempted to return with a four-week trial for Canberra United before the 2017–18 W-League season but was not offered a contract.

Australian rules football career
Ahead of the 2017 AFL Women's season, Brown trialled for the GWS Giants before a knee injury ended her hopes of playing.

In 2019, Brown played for the Eastlake Demons in the AFL Canberra First Grade Women's competition.

Statistics  
Updated to the end of S7 (2022).

|-
| S7 (2022) ||  || 42
| 10 || 0 || 0 || 81 || 20 || 101 || 9 || 15 || 0.0 || 0.0 || 8.1 || 2.0 || 10.1 || 0.9 || 1.5 || 0
|- class="sortbottom"
! colspan=3 | Career
! 10 !! 0 !! 0 !! 81 !! 20 !! 101 !! 9 !! 15 !! 0.0 !! 0.0 !! 8.1 !! 2.0 !! 10.1 !! 0.9 !! 1.5 !! 0
|}

Honours and achievements 
Individual
 Hawthorn games record holder: 10 (Tied with Charlotte Baskaran, Jess Duffin, Aileen Gilroy, Tilly Lucas-Rodd, Akec Makur Chuot, Tamara Smith, and Lucy Wales)

References

1994 births
Living people
Australian women's soccer players
Canberra United FC players
A-League Women players
Women's association football defenders
Hawthorn Football Club (AFLW) players